Grevillea fastigiata is a species of flowering plant in the family Proteaceae and is endemic to the south-west of Western Australia. It is an erect shrub with clustered branches, linear leaves sometimes  with rigid lobes near the tip, and clusters of brownish or scarlet flowers.

Description
The edges of the leaves are rolled under, obscuring most of the lower surface.

Taxonomy
Grevillea fastigiata was first formally described in 1994 by Peter M. Olde and Neil R. Marriott in The Grevillea Book from specimens collected by Olde east of Ravensthorpe. The specific epithet (fastigiata) means "fastigiate", referring to the branchlets.

Distribution and habitat
This grevillea grows in mallee heath or shrubland in the upper catchment of the Jerdacuttup River in the Esperance Plains and Mallee biogeographic regions of south-western Western Australia.

Conservation status
Grevillea fastigiata is listed as  "Priority Four" by the Government of Western Australia Department of Biodiversity, Conservation and Attractions, meaning that it is rare or near threatened.

References

fastigiata
Proteales of Australia
Flora of Western Australia
Plants described in 1994